Owen Yalandja (born 1961) is Aboriginal Australian carver, painter and singer of the Kuninjku people from western Arnhem Land, Australia. A senior member of the Dangkorlo clan, who are the Indigenous custodians of an important site related to female water spirits known as yawkyawk, Yalandja has become internationally renowned for his painted carvings of these spirits, as well as his paintings on eucalyptus bark.

Biography 
Born in 1961, Owen Yalandja belongs to the Kuninjku people within Maningrida (Northern Territory of Central Arnhem Land). He is now a senior member of the Dangkorlo clan, which means that he has the responsibility to be custodians of a yawkyawk site (Yirridjdja moiety) in the Mirrayar billabong. Yawkyawk are female water spirits, similar to the Western mermaids. However, they are more than a mystical creature; to the Kuninjku people, yawkyawks are manifestations of their young female ancestors. These female water spirits can be disturbed or frightened by humans, causing them to retreat or escape into the Mirrayar billabong, Yalandja's custodian site.

Owen Yalandja was known for his singing at the yawkyawk ceremonies, as well as his carved representations of the yawkyawk spirits. Yalandja learned the foundations of his carving techniques from his father, Crusoe Kuningbal. Kuningbal was a renowned ceremonial leader, bark painter, and carver. In the 1960s, he began experimenting and inventing new ways to carving and sculpt mimih spirits. Until the 1980s, Kuningbal was the only Maningrida artist who could carve the mimih spirits. His artwork held ceremonial and sacred meanings, and they were used in a public Kuninjky ceremony called Mamurrng. It is Aboriginal tradition that an artist like Kuningbal will teach the next generation of male artists how to produce similar artwork and the meaning behind it; Yalandja and his brother, Cruose Kurddal, both learned from their father the skills and techniques needed to make these kinds of figures. It wasn't until after Kuningbal's death in 1984 that Yalandja and Kurddal began making large figure carvings themselves.  Kurddal's style remained similar to his fathers, using the same red painted background and dot pattern. Kuningbal's original style can be seen replicated in Kurddal's Mimih spirit (1985), shown in the Art Gallery of New South Wales. Yalandja, on the other hand, began experimenting and expanding beyond his father's teachings; he created new styles, techniques, and content.

Yalandja and Kurddal became successful artists, continuing the legacy of his fathers' artwork and tradition. Kuningbal inspired many Kuninjku people to create similar artwork, but it was Yalandja and Kurddal that led the way in creating mimih and yawkyawk pieces that were new and innovative. Due to their influence and skill, this form of artwork has become one of the most recognizable styles to come from Central Arnhem Land.

Since 2014, Yalandja has lived at the Barrihdjowkkeng outstation which was established by his father, close to the yawkyawk site.

Career 
Instead of the more traditional forms of depicting the yawkyawks (such as bark paintings), Yalandja focused his career on creating large, three-dimensional wood carvings that represent these spirits. The spirits of the yawkyawks were girls from ancestral time, but they have since been transformed into slender water spirits with forked fish-tails, undulating bodies, scales, pointed breasts, and long, featureless faces. According to Yalandja: "Yawkyawk is a bit the equivalent of a mermaid in balanda culture. Yawkyawk is my Dreaming and she lives in the water at Barrihdjowkkeng near where I have set up my outstation. She has always been there. I often visit this place."

While greatly inspired by his father's technique, Yalandja and his brother made the carvings larger to better represent the spirits. Within his collection at the Art Gallery in New South Wales, Yalandja's figures range from 227 cm to 285 cm (7.5 ft to 9.3 ft). Another defining feature of the yawkyawk is the scales; in order to depict these scales, Yalandja would paint the scales in arc-like shapes. For example, this technique can be seen used in combination with his father's classic dot technique in one of his 2001 Yawkyawk pieces, as seen in the Art Gallery of New South Wales. In 1990, he introduced a new 'V'-like technique to better indicate the yawkyawk's individual scales, giving the figure a more watery, "scaly sheen." This technique can be seen in his 1999 Yawkyawk figure, also shown in the Art Gallery of New South Wales. Yalandja recalls learning from his father the dot decoration technique for scales, but he says he likes to make the yawkyawk figures "according to [his] own individual ideas... this style is [his] own, no one else does them like this." Yalandja's innovative design helps to show the spiritual power of these figures, in a similar manner to the way the traditional rarrk (cross-hatching) style of bark art was meant to do.

Another example of Yalandja's innovation is his frequently-used black-coloured background. His father was known for a red painted background, and while some of Yalandja's figures use this background colour(such as the 2001 Yawkyawk), he is well-known for his black background figures (such as his 1999 Yawkyawk pieces). Both the red and black paint are created from natural earth pigments, but the black is more unique whereas the red is more traditional. When looking at the black background figures, they appear richer, with the scale features more clearly contrasted. The increased size, new scale techniques, and black backgrounds are all examples of Yalandja's artistic innovation and creativity.

One aspect of Yalandja's Yawkyawk figures that is particularly unique is the shape of the figures. He is known to specialize in thin, waving, and large structures, making the figure appear sensuous and beautiful. Yalandja captures the spirits' slender, undulating bodies of by selecting pieces of curved wood that show a sense of movement.  It is very unusual for Aboriginal pieces to have this sensual aesthetic; however, it is an important characteristic of the yawkyawks, as they represent fertility and are known to show off their elongated bodies and long-hair in their occasional sunbathing sightings. Additionally, the movement in the wood helps to depicting how she may look while swimming. This unusual innovation helps Yalandja to create a more realistic representation of the yawkyawk figure.

The wood for these carvings can only come from the kurrajong tree (Brachychiton diversifolius), which was the same kind of wood his father would use for his mimih carvings. This wood is strong across the grain, which helps prevent any splitting that may occur while Yalandja is carving the spirit's shape and features Sometimes, this wood would even provide a natural split, perfect to use for the yawkyawk's characteristic forked tail.

While he is best known for his carvings on the kurrajob tree, Yalandja has also painted yawkyawks on eucalyptus barks and hollow-log coffins (known as lorrkkon). Lorrkkon hold human skeletal remains, not the entire body, and are made for both commercial art reasons as well as ceremonial reasons. When made for the art market, the artist is able to choose what to paint on the hollow-logs, making them more like painted sculptures, carvings, or three-dimensional bark art. Yalandja created lorrkkon for art market, painting the log with the same technique he created for the scales of the yawkyawks. This pattern itself does not hold sacred meaning, thus is it considered "outside" and "non-representational; however, any clan member or person with knowledge of Kuninjku customs will understand that this design represents the scales of the yawkyawk spirit. One example of this kind of lorrkkin is his Ndalkodjek Yawkyawk made in 2017 (157.5 cm).

Yalandja's work is held in most significant Australian collections as well as the British Museum, the Hood Museum and the Kluge-Ruhe Aboriginal Art Collection of the University of Virginia. In 2009 he was selected for the inaugural National Indigenous Art Triennial at the National Gallery of Australia, and he is a five-time finalist in the National Aboriginal and Torres Strait Islander Art Awards.

Collections 

 Art Gallery of New South Wales
 Art Gallery of South Australia
 The British Museum
 Hood Museum of Art, Dartmouth College
 Kluge-Ruhe Aboriginal Art Collection of the University of Virginia 
 Museum and Art Gallery of the Northern Territory
 National Gallery of Victoria
 Queensland Art Gallery
 National Gallery of Australia
 Australian Museum, Sydney
 Musée des Confluences, Lyon, France

Significant exhibitions 

 2000: Biennale of Sydney. Art Gallery of New South Wales, Sydney, 26 May – 30 July 2000.
2001: Outside in: Research Engagements with Arnhem Land Art, Drill Hall Gallery, Australian National University, Canberra, 30 August - 7 October 2001.
2004: Crossing Country: The Alchemy of Western Arnhem Land Art. Art Gallery of New South Wales, Sydney, 25 September - 12 December 2004.
 2007: One sun, One moon: Aboriginal Art in Australia. Art Gallery of New South Wales, Sydney, 03 Jul 2007–02 Dec 2007
2007-2009: Culture Warriors: The Australian Indigenous Art Triennial. National Gallery of Australia, Canberra, 13 October 2007 – 10 February 2008; American University Museum, Katzen Arts Center, Washington, D.C., 10 September – 8 December 2009.
Crossing Cultures: The Owen and Wagner Collection of Contemporary Aboriginal Australian Art. Hood Museum of Art, Dartmouth College, Hanover, NH, September 15, 2012 – March 10, 2013; Toledo Museum of Art, Toledo, OH, April 11–July 14, 2013.
2016-17: Sentient Lands. Art Gallery of New South Wales, Sydney, 4 Jun 2016 – 8 Oct 2017.
2019-2020: The Inside World: Contemporary Aboriginal Australian Memorial Poles. Nevada Museum of Art, Reno, NV; Charles H. Wright Museum of African American History, Detroit, MI; The Fralin Museum of Art, University of Virginia, Charlottesville, VA; Frost Art Museum, Florida International University, Miami, FL.

References 

1961 births
Living people
Place of birth missing (living people)
Australian Aboriginal artists
Australian contemporary artists